The Rue Brancion is a street in the Saint-Lambert quarter in the 15th arrondissement of Paris, France.

Route 
Rue Brancion starts at 6, Place d'Alleray and ends at 167, Boulevard Lefebvre.

It forms the eastern boundary of Parc Georges-Brassens and crosses over the disused tracks of the Petite Ceinture railway line.

History 
In 1864, the street was named after Colonel , who was killed in the Malakoff bastion attack in 1855.

The southern part of the street, between Rue des Morillons and Boulevard Lefebvre, was previously known as "rue du Pont de Turbigo".

The street was extended from Rue des Morillons to Rue de Vouillé in 1901, then from Rue de Vouillé to Rue d'Alleray in 1906.

Important and historical buildings 
 No. 10: headquarters of the chairman of France Télécom, then of the Directorate of Population and Migration (2001–06).
Every Saturday and Sunday since 1987, around 50 booksellers gather here for the ancient and second-hand book market.

 In front of this entrance, there are two statues:

 A bit further, the entryway leads to the Monfort-Théâtre.

References 

Streets in the 15th arrondissement of Paris